Mukdengge (Manchu:) is a Manchu masculine given name meaning "prosperous".

Citations

References

See also
Manchu given name

Given names
Manchu masculine given names